Edward Lascelles, 1st Earl of Harewood (7 January 1740 – 3 April 1820) was a British landowner, art collector, peer and, before which, member of parliament.

He was the son of Edward Lascelles, a senior customs official in Barbados, himself a son of Daniel Lascelles. On the death of his cousin, the childless Edwin Lascelles, 1st Baron Harewood, Edward inherited the family fortune made in the West Indies through customs positions and the slave trade. He vested much of his fortune in fine art. In 1799 he (or his immediate family benefit trust) was estimated to be the third-wealthiest small family unit in Britain, owning £2.9M.

He sat as Whig member of parliament for Northallerton from 1761 to 1774 and from 1790 to 1796. The latter year he was raised to the peerage as Baron Harewood, of Harewood in the County of York. In 1812 he was further honoured when he was made Viscount Lascelles and Earl of Harewood, in the County of York.

Edward Lascelles married Anne Chaloner (c. 1742 – 22 February 1805), daughter of Thomas Chaloner of Guisborough and Mary Finny, on 12 May 1761. They had four children:

Lady Mary Anne Lascelles (d. 1831), married Richard York.
Edward Lascelles, Viscount Lascelles (c. 1764–1814), died unmarried.
Henry Lascelles, 2nd Earl of Harewood (1767–1841)
Lady Frances Lascelles (c. 1777–1817), married Hon. John Douglas (1756–1818), son of James Douglas, 14th Earl of Morton and had issue.

References

External links

|-

|-

1740 births
1820 deaths
Lascelles
Lascelles
Lascelles
Peers of Great Britain created by George III
Lascelles
Lascelles
Edward
1